2,4,6-Tribromophenol (TBP) is a brominated derivative of phenol.  It is used as a fungicide, as a wood preservative, and an intermediate in the preparation of flame retardants.

Production 

Although natural TBP has been identified in ocean sediments as a metabolite of marine fauna, the commercial product is prepared industrially.  In 2001, the production volume of TBP was estimated to be 2500 tonnes/year in Japan and 9500 tonnes/year worldwide.  TBP can be prepared by the controlled reaction of elemental bromine with phenol:

Uses 
The predominant use of TBP is as an intermediate in the preparation of flame retardants such as brominated epoxy resins. TBP is reacted with sodium hydroxide to form the sodium salt, which is used as a fungicide and wood preservative.

Bismuth salt 
The bismuth salt is the active ingredient in Xeroform dressing.

Metabolism 
Microbial metabolism in products treated with TBP is known to produce 2,4,6-tribromoanisole (TBA),  which has a musty odor.  In 2010 and 2011, Pfizer and Johnson & Johnson voluntarily recalled some products due to TBA odors from wooden pallets which were treated with TBP.

References 

Fungicides
Bromoarenes
Phenols